The Pilot Training College of Ireland Ltd or simply, Pilot Training College (PTC) was a JAA Flight Training Organisation (JFTO) fully approved for commercial pilot training.

History
In July 2012, RTÉ reported that Irish students who had paid up to €80,000 in fees to train in Florida had been stranded because the Florida Institute of Technology had terminated its agreement with PTC over alleged non-payment.  That same month the IAA withdrew PTC's license, as a result PTC ceased all training, their website was taken offline with no official explanation or apology.

At that time, Conor J Deeny a trainee pilot, assumed the position of spokesman and coordinator for the students stranded in Florida. Since this incident, both himself and all other trainee pilots have left America and returned home.

Training and facilities 
PTC had training facilities in Waterford Airport, Ireland, and multiple locations in Florida, United States. The training provided was in accordance with the European Joint Aviation Authorities (JAA) requirements for commercial pilots.

The school offered a range of courses including:
BSc (Hons) in Airline Transport Operations (3 Year Full-time and 2 Year Part-time)
Integrated Airline Training Program
Airline Pilot Training Program
Pilot license and ratings conversions
Individual modular courses (ATPL, commercial pilot license (CPL), MEP, MEIR)

References

External links
Joint Aviation Authority website
Pilot Training College website
Pilot Training College Student Diary

Flight training
Aviation schools
Companies of the Republic of Ireland